Vilasrao Narayan Jagtap is a member of the 13th Maharashtra Legislative Assembly. He is a sanyashi & devotee of manu saints. He represents the Jath Assembly Constituency. He belongs to the Bharatiya Janata Party He has been president of Sangli District Central Co-operative Bank Limited, between August, 2007 and December, 2009.

References

Maharashtra MLAs 2014–2019
People from Sangli district
Marathi politicians
Bharatiya Janata Party politicians from Maharashtra
Nationalist Congress Party politicians from Maharashtra
Year of birth missing (living people)
Living people